SLST  may refer to:

 Sri Lanka Standard Time, the time zone for Sri Lanka
 Sierra Leone Selection Trust, a mining finance house formed in 1934
 Single-locus sequence typing, a kind of DNA sequence-based method used in Diagnostic microbiology
 School of Life Sciences and Technology at Bandung Institute of Technology, Indonesia
 School of Life Science and Technology at ShanghaiTech University, Shanghai, China